Below is a current list of covered bridges in Virginia.  There are six historic covered bridges remaining in the U.S. state of Virginia, all still at their original locations.

Below is a list of some of the other historic covered bridges in Virginia which were destroyed, removed, or altered.

See also

List of bridges documented by the Historic American Engineering Record in Virginia
List of bridges on the National Register of Historic Places in Virginia

References

 Dale J. Travis Covered Bridges. VA Covered Bridges: Credits. Retrieved Nov. 12, 2007.
 Virginia is for Lovers: Covered Bridges in Virginia. VA Covered Bridges: Credits. Retrieved Nov. 12, 2007.
 Virginia Department of Transportation. VA Covered Bridges: Credits. Retrieved Nov. 12, 2007.
 Covered Bridges Along the Blue Ridge VA Covered Bridges: Credits. Retrieved Nov. 12, 2007.

External links

Covered Bridges in Virginia (Virginia Department of Transportation)
Covered Bridges in Virginia (Virginia Tourism Corporation)
Virginia Covered Bridges List (Dale J. Travis)

Bridges
Virginia covered bridges
Bridges